Luis Otero may refer to:

 Luis Otero Mujica (1879–1940), general and Commander-in-chief of the Chilean Army
 Luis Otero (footballer) (1893–1955), Spanish footballer
 Luis Otero (actor), an Argentine actor